Walter Maria de Silva (born 27 February 1951 in Lecco, Italy) is an Italian car designer and former head of Volkswagen Group Design, until 2015. Since beginning his car design career in 1972 as trainee car designer for Fiat's Style Centre. De Silva has also worked as a designer at I.DE.A Institute, and as head of design for Alfa Romeo, SEAT and the 'Audi brand group'. He is presently President of the Design Studio Walter De Silva & Partners.

Career

Fiat 1972-1977
Walter de Silva began his career in 1972 at age 21, working for Centro Stile Fiat.

I.DE.A. Institute 1977-1986
After his experience at Fiat, Walter de Silva worked at the I.DE.A Institute in Turin, Italy for nine years under the direction of Franco Mantegazza and Renzo Piano.

Alfa Romeo 1986-1999
In 1986 Walter de Silva was recruited away from the I.DE.A. Institute to become head of Alfa Romeo's Centro Stile. Walter de Silva remained in this role until 1999.

At Alfa Romeo, de Silva led the renewal of the brand's design language and repositioning.

SEAT 1999-2002
In 1999 Ferdinand Piëch assigned Walter de Silva to work for the Volkswagen Group SEAT division, with the aim of injecting verve and sportiness to SEAT design. The result was SEAT  'auto emoción'  philosophy which was first demonstrated in the 2000 SEAT Salsa and the 2001 SEAT Tango concept cars, as a foretaste of SEAT new design language, with the latter receiving in 2002 the 'Autonis Award' in the Concept Car category. His more expressive design approach has since influenced the form and look of numerous cars, such as the 2002 SEAT Córdoba and SEAT Ibiza, as well as the 2004 SEAT Altea and 2005 SEAT León which were highly acclaimed and subsequently received several design awards (e.g. Red dot design award, Autonis award, 'The World's Most Beautiful Automobile 2004' award in Milan  etc.).

Audi brand group 2002-2007
In March 2002 Walter de Silva was appointed Head of Design to the now-defunct Audi brand group which encompassed the Audi, SEAT and Lamborghini brands. Volkswagen Group management charged de Silva with giving the Audi range a more emotional design language which included the controversial introduction of the full-height, single-frame front grille that now adorns all Audi models. His first full design for a production Audi was the 2005 A6. He has since gone on to contribute to the 2005 Audi Q7, 2006 Audi TT and the 2007 Audi A5, which is reportedly his favourite design.

Volkswagen Group 2007-2015
Following the appointment of former Audi chairman Martin Winterkorn as the chairman of the Volkswagen Group in January 2007, de Silva was appointed as Head of Volkswagen Group Design effective from 1 February 2007 and was responsible for the overall strategic design direction of all VW passenger car brands including Škoda, SEAT, Volkswagen, Audi, Bentley, Lamborghini and Bugatti. de Silva replaced Murat Günak and his first task was to re-evaluate the designs of three then-imminent Volkswagen models which had been penned by his predecessor: the 2008 Golf, the 2008 Passat CC and the 2008 Scirocco.

Walter De Silva & Partners 2020 - Present 
After some time of inactivity, Walter De Silva launched Walter De Silva & Partners with other designers. This new company offers services of design consultancy to car manufacturers with a strong point on brand & product identity. With his partners, Walter De Silva was in charge of the design of the Hongqi S9 designed for SilkFAW.

Designs

Alfa Romeo
Alfa Romeo Proteo (1991)
Alfa Romeo 146 (1995)
Alfa Romeo 156 (1997)
Alfa Romeo 166 (1998)
Alfa Romeo 147 (2000)

SEAT
SEAT Salsa & Salsa Emoción (2000)
SEAT Tango roadster/spyder/coupé/Racer (2001)
SEAT Ibiza (2002)
SEAT Córdoba (2002)
SEAT Altea Prototipo (2003)
SEAT Altea (2004)
SEAT Toledo (2004)
SEAT León (2005)
 

Audi
Audi A6 (2004)
Audi Q7 (2005)
Audi R8 (2006)
Audi TT (2006)
Audi A5 (2007)
Audi A3 (Typ 8P/8PA) (2003)
Lamborghini
Lamborghini Miura concept (2006)
Lamborghini Egoista (2013)

Volkswagen
Volkswagen CC (2008)
Volkswagen Golf (2008)
Volkswagen Scirocco (2008)
Volkswagen Polo (2009)
Volkswagen Amarok (2010)
Volkswagen Jetta (2010)
Volkswagen Passat (2010)
Volkswagen Sharan (2010)
Volkswagen Touareg (2010)
Volkswagen Beetle (2011)
Volkswagen up! (2011)
Volkswagen Touran (2015)
 Leica Camera
 Leica M9 Titanium

 SilkFAW Automotive
 S9

References

1951 births
Living people
Italian automobile designers
Fiat people
Alfa Romeo people
SEAT people
Audi people
Lamborghini people
Volkswagen Group designers
People from Lecco